José Maria de Freitas Pereira (29 October 1941 – 12 July 2017), known as Pedras, was a Portuguese footballer who played as an attacking midfielder.

External links

1941 births
2017 deaths
Sportspeople from Guimarães
Portuguese footballers
Association football midfielders
Primeira Liga players
Vitória S.C. players
S.L. Benfica footballers
Vitória F.C. players
Sporting CP footballers
Atlético Clube de Portugal players
S.U. Sintrense players
Seixal F.C. players
Portugal youth international footballers
Portugal B international footballers
Portugal international footballers